Hrastje pri Grosupljem is a settlement between Grosuplje and Šmarje-Sap in central Slovenia. The Slovenian A2 motorway runs across the settlement's territory. The area is part of the historical region of Lower Carniola. The Municipality of Grosuplje is now included in the Central Slovenia Statistical Region.

Name
The name of the settlement was changed from Hrastje to Hrastje pri Grosupljem (literally, 'Hrastje near Grosuplje') in 1955. The name Hrastje is derived from the Slovene common noun hrast 'oak', referring to the local vegetation.

References

External links
Hrastje pri Grosupljem on Geopedia

Populated places in the Municipality of Grosuplje